Fahmi Ahmed Abdul Wahab Al-Tahri (15 April 1965) is a former athlete, who represented North Yemen at the 1988 Summer Olympic Games in the Men's 800m he finished 6th in his heat and failed to advance.

References

External links
 

1965 births
Living people
Place of birth missing (living people)
Yemeni male middle-distance runners
Olympic athletes of North Yemen
Athletes (track and field) at the 1988 Summer Olympics